Glenys Lynne Page (11 August 1940 – 7 November 2012) was a New Zealand cricketer who played as a slow left-arm orthodox bowler. She appeared in two One Day Internationals for New Zealand, both at the 1973 World Cup. She played domestic cricket for Auckland.

Page made her debut in New Zealand's inaugural ODI match, against Trinidad and Tobago, in which she took six wickets for twenty runs – the best bowling figures by a player on debut in a WODI, and the only bowler to take a six-wicket haul on WODI debut.

She held the record for best bowling figures by a New Zealander in WODIs from 1973 to 1982, surpassed by Jackie Lord's performance of 6/10 against India at the 1982 Women's Cricket World Cup.

Page died in Auckland on 7 November 2012, aged 72.

References

External links

1940 births
2012 deaths
Cricketers from Auckland
New Zealand women cricketers
New Zealand women One Day International cricketers
Auckland Hearts cricketers